Tazehabad-e Chomaqestan (also Romanized as Tāzehābād-e Chomāqestān; also known as Tāzehābād-e Soflá) is a village in Amlash-e Shomali Rural District, in the Central District of Amlash County, Gilan Province, Iran. At the 2006 census, its population was 73, in 21 families.

References 

Populated places in Amlash County